United Nations Security Council Resolution 196, adopted unanimously on October 30, 1964, after examining the application of Malta for membership in the United Nations, the Council recommended to the General Assembly that Malta be admitted.

See also
List of United Nations Security Council Resolutions 101 to 200 (1953–1965)

References
Text of the Resolution at undocs.org

External links
 

 0196
 0196
1964 in Malta
 0196
October 1964 events